Edward Brooke (1919–2015) was an American politician.

Edward Brooke may also refer to:

Edward Brooke, 6th Baron Cobham (–1464), English peer
Edward Brooke (fencer) (1916–2002), Canadian Olympic fencer
Edward Brooke-Hitching, British author

See also
Edward Brook (1895–1954), New Zealand cricket umpire
Edward Brooks (disambiguation)